Petya Petkova (Bulgarian: Петя Петкова) is a Bulgarian football defender currently playing for NSA Sofia in the Bulgarian Championship. She played the Champions League with Apollon Limassol and NSA Sofia.

She is currently a member of the Bulgarian national team.

References

1991 births
Living people
Bulgarian women's footballers
Bulgaria women's international footballers
Expatriate women's footballers in Cyprus
Apollon Ladies F.C. players
Women's association football defenders
FC NSA Sofia players